The following is a list of lakes of Poland.

 Lake Dabie (Jezioro Dąbie in Szczecin)
 Lake Mamry (Jezioro Mamry in Mazury lake district)
 Lake Sniardwy (Jezioro Śniardwy in Mazury lake district)
 Lake Lebsko (Jezioro Łebsko)
 Lake Miedwie (Jezioro Miedwie)
 Lake Jeziorak (Jezioro Jeziorak)
 Lake Niegocin (Jezioro Niegocin)
 Lake Gardno (Jezioro Gardno)
 Lake Jamno (Jezioro Jamno)
 Lake Wigry (Jezioro Wigry)
 Lake Gopło (Jezioro Gopło)
 Lake Drawsko (Jezioro Drawsko)
 Lake Orzysz (Jezioro Orzysz)
 Lake Uścimowiec
Jezioro Drewęckie
Jezioro Pauzeńskie
Jezioro Szelag  Mały
Jezioro Szelag Duży
Jezioro  Sajmino
Jezioro Perskie
Jezioro Puzy
Jezioro Ruś
Jezioro Morliny
Jezioro Gugowa
Jezioro Jakuba
Jezioro Czarne
Jezioro Srebrne
Jezioro Taburz

See also
 

Poland
Lakes